Prince Petre, known in Russia as the tsarevich Pyotr Aleksandrovich Gruzinsky (26 April 1857 – 3 February 1922) was a Georgian prince (batonishvili), a descendant of the Kartli-Kakhetian branch of the Bagrationi dynasty, the former royal house of Georgia. Petre was the son of Prince Alexander Gruzinsky.

Prince Petre married Princess Tamara Dekanozishvili (1897–1977) at the Navtlugi Church of St. Barbara in Tbilisi in 1915 and had two sons:
Konstantin (1915–1939).
Petre (28 March 1920 – 13 August 1984).

References

ბაგრატიონები, თბილისი, 2003, გვერდი 537 Bagrations, Tbilisi, 2003, page 537
პეტრე ბაგრატიონ-გრუზინსკი, თბილისი, 2004, გვერდი 71 Petre Bagration-Gruzinsky, Tbilisi, 2004, page 71
ჩიმაკაძე გ. ცხოვრება და ღვაწლი დავით სარაჯიშვილისა, თბილისი, 2003, გვერდი 133 Chimakadze G. Life of David Sarajishvili, Tbilisi, 2003, page 133
ჯაგოდნიშვილი თ. ერეკლეს ეპოსი, თბილისი, 2005, გვერდი 180 Jagodnishvili T. Epos of Erekle, Tbilisi, 2005, page 180
Джавахишвили Н. Грузины под российским флагом, Тб., 2003, с.42.

1857 births
1922 deaths
Bagrationi dynasty of the Kingdom of Kartli-Kakheti
Pretenders to the Georgian throne